Dar'a is an area in the eastern Tigray Region of northern Ethiopia. The city of `Addi Galamo, where many pre-Aksumite D`mt and Aksumite artifacts have been found is located in Dar'a.

Tigray Region